The 2019 CS Golden Spin of Zagreb was held in December 2019 in Zagreb, Croatia. It was part of the 2019–20 ISU Challenger Series. Medals were awarded in the disciplines of men's singles, ladies' singles, pair skating, and ice dance.

Entries 
The International Skating Union published the list of entries on November 12, 2019.

Changes to preliminary assignments

Results

Men

Ladies

Pairs

Ice dance

References 

CS Golden Spin of Zagreb
2019 in Croatian sport